Life & Death is a computer game published in 1988 by The Software Toolworks. The player takes the role of an abdominal surgeon. The original packaging for the game included a surgical mask and gloves. A sequel, Life & Death II: The Brain, was published in 1990. In this sequel, the player is a neurosurgeon.

Gameplay

In the role of a resident abdominal surgeon at fictional hospital Toolworks General, the player must diagnose and treat a variety of maladies including kidney stones, arthritis, appendicitis, and aneuritic aorta. The last two require the player to perform surgery.

Reception 

Compute! complimented Life & Deaths graphics and sound, stating that the game effectively used CGA's four colors and the PC speaker, and stated that the game's warning to those queasy of blood was accurate. An author on Gamasutra praised the game for its attention to detail and the way it offers significant depth and challenge despite only the mouse.

Macworld reviewed the Macintosh version of Life & Death, noting its gore and level of difficulty, stating that "If the embossed photo of a bloody brain on the box doesn't get to you, the challenge and frustration of playing the game just might." Macworld praises Life & Death's difficulty and educational value, but criticized the "annoying" copy protection, monochrome graphics, and lack of a save function. The reviewer for Macworld is stated to be a doctor of medicine.

Life & Death was nominated for Software Publishers Association (SPA) awards for Best Game, Best Simulation and Best Use of Technology.

References

External links

1988 video games
Classic Mac OS games
Apple IIGS games
Amiga games
Atari ST games
DOS games
FM Towns games
NEC PC-9801 games
X68000 games
Simulation video games
Medical video games
Video games developed in the United States
The Software Toolworks games